The Council for Christian Colleges & Universities (CCCU) is a global organization of evangelical Christian colleges and universities. The headquarters is in Washington, D.C.

History 
In 1976, presidents of colleges in the Christian College Consortium called a meeting in Washington, D.C. to organize a Coalition for Christian Colleges that could expand the objectives of the consortium. Representatives from 38 colleges participated in the founding meeting to establish a new organization to provide a unified voice representing the interests and concerns of Christian colleges to government decision-makers and the general public. The Coalition and the Consortium shared facilities in Washington, D.C. until 1982, when the Consortium relocated to St. Paul, Minnesota and the Coalition formally incorporated as an independent organization. In 1995, the organization changed its name to the Coalition for Christian Colleges and Universities; in 1999 it changed again to the Council for Christian Colleges and Universities. In 2023, CCCU had 185 members in 21 countries.

Leadership 
In September 2014, Shirley V. Hoogstra, J.D., was named the Council's seventh president. Before that, she was the vice president for student life at Calvin College in Grand Rapids, Michigan, after having served for four years on Calvin's Board of Trustees. While at Calvin, Hoogstra also served as a cabinet member who became familiar with team building, campus-wide planning and communications. She was also the co-host of Inner Compass, a nationally televised show on PBS. She has served in a variety of volunteer leadership roles for CCCU institutes and commissions, and is the Council's first female president. The previous president, Edward O. Blews Jr., served from January 1, 2013, to October 22, 2013. William P. Robinson, former president of Whitworth University, was named the interim president before Hoogstra was appointed.

The council has a 18-member board of directors, most of whom are presidents of member institutions. The chair is Shirley Mullen, president emeritus of Houghton College.

Programs

Advocacy 
The CCCU seeks to provide a unified voice for faith-based institutions of higher learning on policy matters that affect its constituency and to equip members to engage in effective advocacy on the state and local level. The advocacy agenda as of 2019 included concerns about religious liberty, institutional autonomy, student financial aid, immigration, environmental stewardship, and government regulation affecting higher education.

Services 
The CCCU provides programs and services for presidents and administrators, trustees, faculty, and students of member institutions. These include many professional development opportunities, such as annual gatherings for its college and university presidents, and annual conferences for member Chief Institutional Development Officers; Communication, Marketing and Media Officers; Chief Enrollment Officers; Chief Financial Officers; Campus Ministry Directions, and other leadership development programs. Other member services include webinars, grant-making opportunities for scholarship and research, discipline specific forums, networking communities, a tuition waver exchange program, and an online career center. Members also receive access to the Council's biannual magazine called CCCU ADVANCE, as well as regular news updates, website resources on scholarship, and information related to Christian higher education policy and issues. In 2019 the Council launched an online consortium to allow participating schools to share online courses.

CCCU GlobalEd 
The CCCU administers a number of student off-campus study programs around the world through CCCU GlobalEd (formerly known as BestSemester). Its first off-campus program, the American Studies Program, was established in Washington, D.C. in the 1970s. It added a contemporary music program in Nashville and a film studies program in Los Angeles, as well as international study abroad programs in Australia, Latin America, the Middle East, Northern Ireland, Oxford, England, and Uganda. Over 14,500 students and growing have benefitted from these academically rigorous, Christ-centered, experiential education programs for almost 50 years. The Australian and Latin American programs ceased operation in 2020. The Nashville, Los Angeles, Uganda, and Northern Ireland programs have all been acquired by CCCU member institutions. A program in Russia (Russian Studies Program) operated from 1994 to 2010. A program in China (China Studies Program) operated from 2000 to 2016 . A program in India (India Studies Program) operated from 2011 to 2015.

Membership 
CCCU institutions are accredited, comprehensive colleges and universities whose missions are Christ-centered and rooted in the historic Christian faith. Most also have curricula rooted in the arts and sciences. The CCCU’s mission is to advance the cause of Christ-centered higher education and to help our institutions transform lives by faithfully relating scholarship and service to biblical truth. Member institutions are divided into four major categories depending on type of institution, agreement the council's defining commitments, and geographical location.

In 2016, the organization adopted a membership policy that contains a clause affirming its commitment to heterosexual Christian marriage. The policy defined six criteria according to which affiliated schools would be designated as governing members, associate members, or collaborative partners. Schools located outside of the United States or Canada are classified as International Affiliates.

Governing member institutions 
Governing (voting) members must fulfill all six criteria:
 Christian mission
 Institutional type and accreditation (must offer a "comprehensive undergraduate curricula rooted in the arts and sciences")
 Cooperation and participation (dues)
 Institutional integrity (financial ethics)
 Employment policies (full-time faculty and administrators must be professing Christians), and
 Christian distinctions and advocacy (must support the advocacy agenda determined by the Board of Directors, including a sexual ethic committed to heterosexual marriage, care for the marginalized and suffering, and environmental stewardship).

Associate member institutions
Associate members must meet all the same criteria as governing members except institutional type and accreditation. Thus, institutions that do not offer a comprehensive undergraduate program (including Bible colleges or seminaries) can be associate members.

Collaborative partner institutions
Collaborative partners must meet the first four criteria set for governing members (Christian mission, institutional type and accreditation, cooperation and participation, and institutional integrity), but may depart from last two: employment policies and Christian distinctions and advocacy. Institutions that do not require all of their faculty to be professing Christians and/or do not agree with all elements of the CCCU's advocacy agenda, but nevertheless wish to take part in the council's programs and partnerships, may be collaborative partners.

International affiliates
The CCCU has more than 30 colleges and universities in countries outside the U.S. and Canada.

Former members
The following institutions are not current members.

References

External links
Official website
Top Online Christian colleges

 
International college and university associations and consortia
Evangelical educational organizations